Eucalyptus laevopinea, commonly known as the silver top stringybark, is a tree that is endemic to eastern Australia. It has rough, stringy greyish bark on the trunk and larger branches, glossy green, lance-shaped adult leaves, flower buds in groups of between seven and eleven, white flowers and hemispherical or shortened spherical fruit.

Description
It has rough, thick, stringy, greyish bark on the trunk and larger branches, smooth whitish bark above. Flowering occurs between January and April or between July and September and the flowers are white.

Taxonomy and naming
Eucalyptus laevopinea was first described in 1898 by Richard Thomas Baker in Proceedings of the Linnean Society of New South Wales.  The specific epithet (laevopinea) is derived from the Latin laevo- meaning 'left' and pinene, an essential oil, referring to the levorotatory pinene.

Distribution and habitat
The silver top stringybark occurs between the Rylstone district in New South Wales to the Warwick and Stanthorpe districts in southern Queensland. It grows in hilly areas of the tablelands in open forest.

References 

laevopinea
Myrtales of Australia
Flora of New South Wales
Flora of Queensland
Plants described in 1898
Taxa named by Richard Thomas Baker